Jack Sparkes (born 29 September 2000) is an English footballer who plays as a defender for  club Exeter City.

Career
Sparkes began his career with Exeter City and made his professional debut for the Grecians on 12 August 2017 in a 1–1 away draw at Swindon Town. He then made his first appearance at Exeter's home ground St James Park the following week in a 1–0 win over Lincoln City. He scored his first goal for Exeter in an EFL Trophy tie against Yeovil Town on 29 August 2017.

In October 2018, Sparkes joined National League South side Chippenham Town on a one-month loan deal. On 21 December, he was loaned out again, this time to Salisbury FC for one month. The deal was later extended until the end of the season.

Sparkes broke into the Exeter City first team in the first half of the 2019–20 season, making 17 first-team appearances in League Two before being ruled out for the rest of the campaign with a knee injury sustained against Newport County.

Following his recovery from a shoulder injury suffered early on in the 2021–22 season, Sparkes joined National League side Torquay United on loan on 9 December 2021, with the deal lasting until 8 January 2022.

Career statistics

Honours
Exeter City
League Two runner-up: 2021–22

References

External links
Jack Sparkes at the Exeter City official website

2000 births
Living people
English footballers
Exeter City F.C. players
Chippenham Town F.C. players
Salisbury F.C. players
Torquay United F.C. players
Association football defenders
Association football midfielders
English Football League players
National League (English football) players
Southern Football League players